Willow Glen is a former settlement in Madera County, California.

References

Former settlements in Madera County, California
Former populated places in California